Sold Out: How High-Tech Billionaires & Bipartisan Beltway Crapweasels Are Screwing America's Best & Brightest Workers is a 2015 book authored by Michelle Malkin and John Miano, a displaced high-tech professional, author and attorney who specializes in business immigration law at the policy level.

The book confronts the perception of a STEM professional shortage, exposes the flawed economics supporting the perception, and cites findings that offshore outsourcing firms are the predominant users of high-skill temporary employment-visas. The book's publication follows media reporting that  Pfizer, Southern California Edison, and Walt Disney World to name a few, have each forced hundreds of employees to train their foreign replacements or risk their severance, unemployment eligibility and professional references.  Additional studies cited conclude that a high percentage of qualified U.S. STEM professionals are unable to find employment in their field.

Overview
Rather than an exposé on the illegal immigration topic, Sold Out highlights temporary-employment immigration, watered-down regulations, the lack of will and authority of regulators to vet applicants and investigate abuses.

Malkin is the daughter of immigrants from the Philippines, and Sold Out is a continuation of her writings on the immigration topic. Invasion (2002) was her first published book, a New York Times Best Seller reaching #14.  Collectively, Malkin refers to K street lobbyists, their multinational benefactors and the politicians who cave to their demands as crapweasels in Sold Out.

Miano is a software engineer and author of numerous programming books, he is a founder of the Programmers Guild and has been a Fellow at the Center for Immigration Studies since 2008. He earned his J.D. from Seton Hall University and has testified before Congress on three occasions.

Reception
In an interview and call-in segment on  the Washington Journal (C-SPAN), Malkin and Miano noted bipartisan consensus on the topic among the callers, regardless of Malkin's known conservative leanings.

New York Times
The New York Times did not do a book review on this Malkin book, and they ignored her use of the term crapweasel in the plural on the cover. In 2009 they praised her first hardcover book.

See also
 AC21 (Extends H-1B & L-1 visas beyond limitation statutes)

References 

2015 non-fiction books
Books about immigration to the United States
Simon & Schuster books
Books by Michelle Malkin